The following is a list of the longest-serving ministers of the Union Council of Ministers of India, listing only those individuals who served at least 10 years in Union ministries. As ministers often hold multiple portfolios during their respective tenures, only their final portfolios and the periods they served in their ranks are displayed here. Party affiliations are those held during the tenure (s) in office of each respective officeholder. Since the first Union Council was established in 1947, its members have been categorised into the following five ranks (in descending order):

The Prime Minister
The Deputy Prime Minister (if one has been appointed)
Cabinet Ministers
Ministers of State (without membership of the Union Cabinet), in the following sub-categories:
Ministers of State with Cabinet rank
Ministers of State with Independent Charge of ministries/portfolios
Ministers of State, reporting to the Prime Minister or to a Cabinet Minister
Deputy Ministers (equivalent to Parliamentary Secretaries). Deputy Ministers have not been appointed since 1993.

Ministers in the first three ranks comprise the Union Cabinet, which is the supreme decision-making body of the nation per Article 75 of the Constitution. Regardless of rank, any member of the Union Council is a Union minister, per the Salaries and Allowances of Ministers Act 1952.

 Died in office

Notes

References

Parliament of India
Union ministers of India
Cabinet of India
India
Council of Ministers of India
Lists of people by time in office
Lists of political office-holders in India
Lists of Indian politicians